The 2020–21 Slovak Basketball League season was the 29th season of the top-tier basketball competition in Slovakia. Spišskí Rytieri won its first ever Slovak championship. Rytieri also won the Slovak Basketball Cup, thus winning the double.

Teams 

Seven teams of the previous season are repeating participation in the league, while Slávia Žilina and Rieker Com Therm Komárno withdrew due to financial difficulties.

League Standings

Playoffs

Quarter-finals 
Inter Bratislava vs. BKM Lučenec

Iskra Svit vs. Prievidza

Semi-finals
Patrioti Levice vs. Inter Bratislava

Spis Knights vs. Iskra Svit

Slovak clubs in Regional competitions

References

External links 

 Slovak Extraliga official website

Slovak
Basketball
Slovak Extraliga (basketball)